The Bram Stoker Award for Novel is an award presented by the Horror Writers Association (HWA) for "superior achievement" in horror writing for novels.

Winners and nominees
The following are the winners and nominees. Finalists (nominees) are listed under the winner(s) for each year, respectively.

The year of eligibility listed in the table is the year that the work was published; the ceremony when the honor was awarded happening the following year.

Multiple winners 
Ordered first by wins and then by alphabetical order.
 Stephen King (6)
 Peter Straub (5)
 Robert R. McCammon (3)
 Stephen Graham Jones (2)
 Sarah Langan (2)
 Paul Tremblay (2)

Multiple nominees

Ordered first by nominations, then by at least one win, and finally by alphabetical order.

† indicates that the writer also won the award in exactly one occasion (up-to-date as of the 2021 Bram Stoker Awards).

 Stephen King (15)
 Peter Straub (7)
 Tom Piccirilli (6)†
 Robert R. McCammon (5)
 Joe McKinney (4)†
 Dan Simmons (4)†
 Gary A. Braunbeck (4)
 Jonathan Maberry (4)
 Owl Goingback (3)†
 Stephen Graham Jones (3)
 Richard Laymon (3)†
 Joe Hill (3)
 Dean R. Koontz (3)
 Josh Malerman (3)
 Paul Tremblay (3)
 Thomas Harris (2)†
 Steve Rasnic Tem (2)†
 Poppy Z. Brite (2)
 Patrick Freivald (2)
 Gregory Lamberson (2)
 Sarah Langan (2)
 Joe R. Lansdale (2)
 Bentley Little (2)
 S. P. Miskowski (2)
 Chuck Palahniuk (2)
 Christopher Rice (2)
 Jeff Strand (2)
 Lee Thomas (2)
 Chet Williamson (2)
 F. Paul Wilson (2)

References

External links
 Stoker Award on the HWA web page
 Graphical listing of all Bram Stoker award winners and nominees

 

Novel
Bram Stoker Award for Novel winners
1987 establishments in the United States
Awards established in 1987
English-language literary awards